The 1964 Round Australia Trial, officially the Ampol Trial was the tenth running of the Round Australia Trial. The rally took place between 14 and 28 June 1964. The event covered 11,260 kilometres around Australia. It was won by Harry Firth and Graham Hoinville, driving a Ford Cortina GT.

Results

References

Rally competitions in Australia
Round Australia Trial